Mad Vallis is a vallis (valley) in the Hellas quadrangle of Mars, with its location centered at 56.5° S and 283.9° W.  It is 524 km long and was named after the Mad River in Vermont, USA.

References 

Valleys and canyons on Mars
Hellas quadrangle